Mount Monica is a  mountain summit located in the Purcell Mountains in southeast British Columbia, Canada. The first ascent of the mountain was made in August 1911 by E. W. Harnden, M. Coffin, and J. Poorman via the southeast ridge. The peak was named by Edward Warren Harnden after his mother. The mountain's name was officially adopted June 9, 1960, by the Geographical Names Board of Canada.

Climate

Based on the Köppen climate classification, Mount Monica is located in a subarctic climate zone with cold, snowy winters, and mild summers. Temperatures can drop below −20 °C with wind chill factors  below −30 °C. Precipitation runoff from Mount Monica and meltwater from its surrounding glaciers drains west into Glacier Creek which is a  tributary of the Duncan River, or east into Horsethief Creek, which is a tributary of the Columbia River.

Climbing Routes
Established climbing routes on Mount Monica:

 Southeast Ridge -  First ascent 1911
 Southwest Ridge -  First ascent 1994

See also

 Geography of British Columbia
 Geology of British Columbia

References

External links
 Weather: Mount Monica

Three-thousanders of British Columbia
Purcell Mountains
Kootenay Land District